The Military ranks of Seychelles are the military insignia used by the Seychelles People's Defence Force.

Commissioned officer ranks
The rank insignia of commissioned officers.

Other ranks
The rank insignia of non-commissioned officers and enlisted personnel.

References

External links
 

Seychelles
Military of Seychelles